Obesotoma iessoensis is a species of sea snail, a marine gastropod mollusk in the family Mangeliidae.

Distribution
This species occurs in the Sea of Japan.

References

 Smith, E.A. (1875) A list of the Gastropoda collected in Japanese seas by Commander H. C. St. John. R.N. Annals and Magazine of Natural History, series 4, 15: 414–427

External links
 Pilsbry & Stearns (1895) Catalogue of the marine mollusks of Japan, with descriptions of new species and notes on others collected by Frederick Stearns; Detroit,Frederick Stearns,1895. 
 Biolib.cz: Obesotoma iessoensis

iessoensis
Gastropods described in 1875